The Atka mackerel (Pleurogrammus monopterygius) is a mackerel in the family Hexagrammidae. Atka mackerel are common in the northern Pacific ocean, and are one of only two members of the genus Pleurogrammus - the other being the Arabesque greenling (Pleurogrammus azonus). The Atka mackerel was named for Atka Island (Atx̂ax̂ in Aleut), the largest island of the Andreanof islands, a branch of the Aleutians.

Taxonomy
The Atka mackerel was originally described under the genus Labrax, but has since been moved to Pleurogrammus. Both names are attributed to Peter Simon Pallas, who published his description of the fish in 1810, roughly a year before his death.

Atka mackerel were once considered to be synonymous with Arabesque greenlings. The combined species would have been called the Okhotsk Atka mackerel, a name now used only for the greenling. The two fishes are, in reality, two distinct species.

Description

Adults have five vertical, blackish bands on their bodies, which are normally yellowish. Atka mackerel can be distinguished from other, similar species by the number of spines and rays that they have on their fins. They have 21 spines, and anywhere from 25-29 rays on their dorsal fins, and only one spine (but 24-26 rays) on their anal fins.

Distribution and habitat

Found exclusively in the northern Pacific, Atka mackerel are known from the Sea of Japan and the waters off Hokkaido, as well as the southern Kuril Islands, and from Stalemate and Bowers Bank in the Aleutian chain to Icy bay, Alaska. They can also be rarely seen as far south as Redondo Beach, California.

Migration 
They migrate from shelves to coastal waters to spawn which occurs (in the Aleutians) from July to September. Their eggs adhere to crevices in the rocks, and incubate for 40–45 days. Males guard the clutches of eggs until they hatch.

Ecology 
The fish feed on copepods and euphausiids. They are, in turn, preyed upon by several species such as bony fishes, (coho salmon, sablefish, Polypera simushirae, Pacific cod, Pacific halibut, and Arrowtooth flounder) mammals (Steller's sea lion), birds (Thick-billed murre), and rays (the Aleutian skate, White-blotched skate, and the Alaska skate) and an important food source for birds, other fish and mammals.

Fisheries
Atka mackerel are used as food in the Aleutian chain, and can be caught as game fish. American ichthyologist David Starr Jordan wrote about fishing for Atka mackerel on May 28, 1892, in American Food and Game Fishes:
 The fish were in schools and it was easy to get great numbers; in fact, one would be kept very busy hauling in the fish and taking them off the hook... When first hooked they would come up very readily, in fact they seemed to swim upward until near the surface when they would become alarmed and dart back and forth in their efforts to free themselves. The sport was very exciting. During 4 hours fishing 9 persons with 26 lines took 585 fish... And as our ship was out of fresh meat of every kind, all these fish were soon eaten by the officers and crew.

In games 
In Black Desert Online, Atka Mackerel can be caught to cook or sell to Trade Masters.

References

External links
Atka mackerel at Fishbase
Atka mackerel at NOAA

Atka mackerel
Fish of the North Pacific
Atka mackerel